The 2004–05 Romanian Hockey League season was the 75th season of the Romanian Hockey League. Six teams participated in the league, and Steaua Bucuresti won the championship.

Regular season

Playoffs

Semifinals
CSA Steaua Bucuresti - Dinamo Bucharest (17-4, 14-3, 11-3)
SC Miercurea Ciuc - Progym Gheorgheni (3-1, 9-2, 5-0)

5th place
HC Miercurea Ciuc - Sportul Studențesc Bucharest (6-3, 2-3, 7-2)

3rd place
Progym Gheorgheni - Dinamo Bucharest (2-3, 1-2, 4-2, 6-3, 9-5)

Final
CSA Steaua Bucuresti - SC Miercurea Ciuc (4-5, 4-2, 5-2, 0-4, 1-3, 5-4, 4-3)

External links
Season on hockeyarchives.info

Romanian Hockey League seasons
Romanian
Rom